This is a list of former and current politicians outside of the Greater China region who were/are of partial or full Chinese descent.

Heads of state and heads of government

This is a list of heads of state and heads of government outside of Greater China of Chinese origin. Entries are sorted according to dates of assumption of office.

Kings and queens

Dynasties
This is a list of dynasties—both sovereign and non-sovereign—outside of Greater China of either Chinese descent of Chinese born. Despite the presence of historical records, the alleged Chinese descent of some of the following dynasties are contested by modern scholars. Entries are sorted according to establishment dates.

Non-dynastic monarchs
This is a list non-dynastic monarchs outside of Greater China of partial or full Chinese heritage. Entries are sorted according to reign dates.

Other politicians

This is a list of politicians who were/are not heads of state and heads of government outside of Greater China of partial or full Chinese heritage. Entries are sorted according to alphabetical order.

Australia

 Alec Fong Lim
 Bernice Pfitzner
 Bill O'Chee
 David Wang
 Dio Wang
 Ernest Wong
 Gai Brodtmann
 Gladys Liu
 Harry Chan
 Helen Bullock
 Helen Sham-Ho
 Henry Tsang
 Hong Lim
 Ian Goodenough
 Jack Ah Kit
 Jenny Leong
 Jing Lee
 John So
 Katrina Fong Lim
 Michael Choi
 Michael Johnson
 Ngaree Ah Kit
 Penny Wong
 Peter Wong
 Pierre Yang
 Tsebin Tchen

Belize
 Eric Chang
 Lee Mark Chang
 William Quinto

Brunei
 Lim Jock Hoi
 Lim Jock Seng
 Steven Chong Wan Oon

Cambodia
 Cham Prasidh
 Chan Sarun
 Eng Chhai Eang
 Hok Lundy
 Hong Sun Huot
 Hou Yuon
 Hu Nim
 Hun Manet
 Hun Many
 Im Chhun Lim
 Kang Kek Iew
 Keo Puth Rasmey
 Khem Veasna
 Khy Taing Lim
 Kuoch Ky
 Lon Non
 Mu Sochua
 Norodom Rattana Devi
 Roland Eng
 Sam Rainsy
 Sam Sary
 So Khun
 Suy Sem
 Ta Mok
 Tioulong Saumura

Canada
 Adrienne Clarkson
 Alan Lowe
 Alice Wong
 Anne Kang
 Arnold Chan
 Art Lee
 Bhutila Karpoche
 Billy Pang
 Bob Wong
 Cathy Wong
 Chin Lee
 Chungsen Leung
 Cynthia Lai
 Daisy Wai
 David Lam
 David Xiao
 Denzil Minnan-Wong
 Dicki Chhoyang
 Dorothy Kostrzewa
 Doug Bing
 Douglas Jung
 Gary Mar
 Geng Tan
 George Chow
 George Ho Lem
 Gordon Chong
 Han Dong
 Henry Woo
 Ida Chong
 Inky Mark
 Jason Luan
 Jean B. Lumb
 Jean Yip
 Jenny Kwan
 John Yap
 Josephine Pon
 Katrina Chen
 Kelvin Ng
 Kenny Chiu
 Kerry Jang
 Kristyn Wong-Tam
 Laurin Liu
 Lillian Dyck
 Mary Ng
 Mary-Woo Sims
 Meili Faille
 Michael Chan
 Michael Chong
 Michael Lee
 Norman Kwong
 Olivia Chow
 Patrick Wong
 Peter Wing
 Peter Wong
 Philip S. Lee
 Raymond Chan
 Raymond Louie
 Richard Lee
 Sean Chu
 Shaun Chen
 Shirley Hoy
 Simon De Jong
 Soo Wong
 Sophia Leung
 Tany Yao
 Ted Hsu
 Teresa Wat
 Teresa Woo-Paw
 Thomas Dang
 Tony Tang
 Tony Wong
 Victor Oh
 Vincent Ke
 Vivienne Poy
 Ying Hope
 Yuen Pau Woo
 Wai Young

Estonia
 Mihhail Kõlvart

Fiji
 Dixon Seeto
 James Ah Koy
 Kenneth Low
 Pio Wong
 William Yee

France
 Buon Tan
 Jeanne d'Hauteserre

Gabon
 Jean Ping

Guam
 Antonio Borja Won Pat
 Douglas Moylan
 Judith Won Pat
 Kaleo Moylan
 Kurt Moylan

Guatemala
 Lucrecia Hernández Mack
 Marco Antonio Yon Sosa

Guyana

 Arthur Chung

 Robert Victor Evan Wong

Honduras
 William Chong Wong

Indonesia
 Alvin Lie
 Basuki Tjahaja Purnama
 Bob Hasan
 Charles Honoris
 Christiandy Sanjaya
 Darmadi Durianto
 Han Bwee Kong
 Han Chan Piet
 Han Oen Lee
 Hok Hoei Kan
 Ignasius Jonan
 Jusuf Wanandi
 Khouw Kim An
 Khouw Tian Sek
 Kwik Kian Gie
 Lauw Tek Lok
 Lie Tjoe Hong
 Loa Sek Hie
 Mari Elka Pangestu
 Mochammad Anton
 Oei Tiong Ham
 Oey Bian Kong
 Oey Djie San
 Oey Giok Koen
 Oey Khe Tay
 Phoa Beng Gan
 Phoa Liong Gie
 Soero Pernollo
 Souw Beng Kong
 Tan Eng Goan
 Tan Tjoen Tiat
 Thung Sin Nio
 Tio Tek Ho
 Tjong A Fie
 Tjung Tin Jan
 Yenny Wahid

Ireland
 Hazel Chu

Jamaica
 Delroy Chuck
 Horace Chang
 Rose Leon

Japan
 Chōsokabe Kunichika
 Chōsokabe Morichika
 Chōsokabe Motochika
 Hata Yuichiro
 Inamine Keiichi
 Kiyuna Tsugumasa
 Li Dan
 Nakaima Hirokazu
 Renhō

Kiribati
 Harry Tong

Korea
 Ahn Byong-man
 Alcheon
 An Bangjun
 Baek Du-jin
 Ban Ki-moon
 Byeon Yeong-tae
 Chang Chun-ha
 Chang Myon
 Chang Sŏng-min
 Chang Taek-sang
 Cheon Ho-sun
 Chin Dae-je
 Chin Young
 Cho Won-jin
 Cho Yoon-sun
 Choo Byung-jik
 Choo Mi-ae
 Chu Yo-han
 Chun Jung-bae
 Chung Sye-kyun
 Do Jong-hwan
 Eo Jae-yeon
 Gang Jo
 Gi Ja-oh
 Gil Jae
 Gil Seon-ju
 Gong Sung-jin
 Gwak Jae-u
 Hong Beom-do
 Hong Chi-jung
 Hong Sook-ja
 Hwang Hui
 Hwang Jang-yop
 Hwang Jin
 Hwang Pyong-so
 Hwang Yun-gil
 Hwangbo In
 Im Chung-sik
 Im Gwang
 Im Gyeong-eop
 Im Jong-seok
 Im Sahong
 In Jae-keun
 Ja Song-nam
 Jang Hyeongwang
 Jang Tae-wan
 Je Jong-geel
 Jeong In-hong
 Jeong Se-hyun
 Ji Cheong-cheon
 Ji Sang-wook
 Jo Heon
 Jo So-ang
 Kang Kyung-wha
 Ki Dong-min
 Lho Shin-yong
 Lyuh Woon-hyung
 Min Chi-rok
 Min Won-sik
 Min Yeong-chan
 Min Young-hwan
 Na Kyung-won
 Nam Duck-woo
 Nam Gon
 Nam Kyung-pil
 O Yun-gyeom
 Oh Joon
 Oh Se-hoon
 Paik Sun-yup
 Ra Jong-yil
 Rha Woong-bae
 Roh Hoe-chan
 Seo Hui
 Seol Chong
 Shin Kuhn
 Song Ikpil
 Song Ja
 Song Jun-gil
 Song Min-soon
 Song Oh-kyun
 Song Sang-hyeon
 Song Si-yeol
 Song Yi-kyun
 Song Yo-chan
 Song Young-gil
 Song Young-moo
 Won Gyun
 Won Hee-ryong
 Won Sei-hoon
 Won Yoo-chul
 Woo Won-shik
 Yeo U-gil
 Yeom Dong-jin
 Yi Dong-nyeong
 Yi Gwal
 Yi Sang-ryong
 Yim Tae-hee
 Yoo Seong-min
 Yu Jae-hung
 Yun Chi-ho
 Yun Young-sun

Laos
 Phoumi Nosavan
 Quinim Pholsena

Malaysia
 Alice Lau
 Anuar Tan Abdullah
 Anthony Loke
 Cha Kee Chin
 Chan Foong Hin
 Chan Kong Choy
 Chan Ming Kai
 Chang Lih Kang
 Chen Man Hin
 Chew Hoong Ling
 Chew Mei Fun
 Chin Peng
 Chong Chieng Jen
 Chong Eng
 Chong Hon Nyan
 Chong Sin Woon
 Choong Shiau Yoon
 Chor Chee Heung
 Chow Kon Yeow
 Christina Liew
 Chua Jui Meng
 Chua Soi Lek
 Chua Soon Bui
 Chua Tee Yong
 Chua Tian Chang
 Chung Keng Quee
 Chung Kok Ming
 Chung Thye Phin
 Daniel Wa Wai How
 David E. L. Choong
 Ding Kuong Hiing
 Edmund Chong Ket Wah
 Elizabeth Wong
 Er Teck Hwa
 Fan Yew Teng
 Fatimah Abdullah
 Fong Chan Onn
 Fong Kui Lun
 Fong Po Kuan
 Frankie Gan
 Gan Peck Cheng
 Gan Ping Sieu
 George Chan Hong Nam
 Goh Hock Guan
 Goh Leong San
 Gooi Hsiao Leung
 H. S. Lee
 Hannah Yeoh
 Hee Loy Sian
 Hee Tien Lai
 Hiew King Cheu
 Hoh Khai Mun
 Hou Kok Chung
 Hsing Yin Shean
 James Wong Kim Min
 Jeff Ooi
 Julian Tan
 June Leow
 Kathleen Wong
 Kelvin Yii Lee Wuen
 Kerk Choo Ting
 Kerk Kim Hock
 Khoo Poay Tiong
 Khoo Soo Seang
 Ko Chung Sen
 Koh Lay Huan
 Koh Nai Kwong
 Koh Tsu Koon
 Kong Cho Ha
 Lai Meng Chong
 Lai Teck
 Larry Sng
 Law Choo Kiang
 Law Hieng Ding
 Lee Boon Chye
 Lee Chee Leong
 Lee Hwa Beng
 Lee Kim Sai
 Lee Kim Shin
 Lee Lam Thye
 Lee Loy Seng
 Lee San Choon
 Lee Yoon Thim
 Leong Yew Koh
 Liang Teck Meng
 Liew Chin Tong
 Liew Vui Keong
 Lim Ah Lek
 Lim Ah Siang
 Lim Boo Chang
 Lim Chong Eu
 Lim Guan Eng
 Lim Keng Yaik
 Lim Kit Siang
 Lim Lip Eng
 Lim Swee Aun
 Linda Tsen
 Ling Liong Sik
 Liow Tiong Lai
 Loh Gwo Burne
 Lye Siew Weng
 Mah Hang Soon
 Mah Siew Keong
 Maria Chin Abdullah
 Mary Yap
 Maszlee Malik
 Michael Chen
 Michael Teo Yu Keng
 Mohamad Fatmi Che Salleh
 Mohammad Nizar Jamaluddin
 Mohamed Rahmat
 Nathaniel Tan
 Ng Wei Aik
 Ng Yen Yen
 Nga Kor Ming
 Ngeh Koo Ham
 Noor Hisham Abdullah
 Nur Jazlan Mohamed
 Nurul Izzah Anwar
 Ong Ka Chuan
 Ong Ka Ting
 Ong Kee Hui
 Ong Kian Ming
 Ong Tee Keat
 Ong Tiang Swee
 Ong Yoke Lin
 Oscar Ling
 Pang Hok Liong
 Paul Leong Khee Seong
 Peter Chin Fah Kui
 Peter Lo Su Yin
 Poh Ah Tiam
 Richard Ho
 Robert Lau
 Seah Tee Heng
 Sebastian Ting Chiew Yew
 See Chee How
 Sim Kui Hian
 Sim Tong Him
 Sim Tze Tzin
 Soh Chin Aun
 Stephen Kalong Ningkan
 Stephen Yong Kuet Tze
 Steven Sim
 Su Keong Siong
 Suriani Abdullah
 Tan Ah Eng
 Tan Chai Ho
 Tan Chee Khoon
 Tan Cheng Lock
 Tan Hiok Nee
 Tan Kee Kwong
 Tan Kee Soon
 Tan Kok Wai
 Tan Koon Swan
 Tan Lian Hoe
 Tan Seng Giaw
 Tan Siew Sin
 Tan Tee Beng
 Tan Tong Hye
 Tan Yee Kew
 Tang Heap Seng
 Tee Hock Seng
 Tee Siew Kiong
 Teh Chai Aan
 Teh Kok Lim
 Teng Boon Soon
 Teo Kok Seong
 Teo Nie Ching
 Teresa Kok
 Ting Chew Peh
 Tiong King Sing
 Tiong Thai King
 Tony Pua
 Victor Gu
 Violet Yong
 Vivian Wong Shir Yee
 Wee Choo Keong
 Wee Jeck Seng
 Wee Ka Siong
 William Leong
 Wong Chen
 Wong Foon Meng
 Wong Ho Leng
 Wong Hon Wai
 Wong Kah Woh
 Wong Ling Biu
 Wong Pow Nee
 Wong Sai Hou
 Wong Shu Qi
 Wong Soon Koh
 Wong Sze Phin
 Wong Tack
 Wong Tien Fatt
 Yap Ah Loy
 Yap Ah Shak
 Yap Kwan Seng
 Yap Pian Hon
 Yeo Bee Yin
 Yeow Chai Thiam
 Yong Khoon Seng
 Yong Teck Lee
 Zairil Khir Johari

Mauritius
 Joseph Tsang Mang Kin
 Moilin Jean Ah-Chuen
 Yeung Kam John Yeung Sik Yuen

Mexico
 Miguel Ángel Osorio Chong

Myanmar
 Aung Gyi
 Bai Xuoqian
 Bao Youxiang
 Edward Michael Law-Yone
 Kyaw Myint
 Kyi Maung
 Nang Yin
 Ohn Myint
 Pheung Kya-shin
 Sai Leun
 Sandar Win
 Soe Moe Thu
 Tan Yu Sai
 Yang Mao-liang

The Netherlands
 Ing Yoe Tan
 Khee Liang Phoa
 Mei Li Vos
 Roy Ho Ten Soeng
 Varina Tjon-A-Ten

New Zealand
 Jian Yang
 Kenneth Wang
 Meng Foon
 Naisi Chen
 Pansy Wong
 Peter Chin
 Raymond Huo

Norway
 Julia Wong

Pakistan
 Hakim Said

Papua New Guinea
 Byron Chan
 Walter Schnaubelt

Peru
 Enrique Wong Pujada
 Humberto Lay
 José Antonio Chang
 Ricardo Wong
 Víctor Joy Way
 Víctor Polay

The Philippines
 Abdusakur Mahail Tan
 Abraham Tolentino
 Alberto Lim
 Alfonso Yuchengco
 Alfredo Lim
 Amelia Gordon
 Ananias Laico
 Antonio Tinio
 Arnold Atienza
 Arsenio Lacson
 Arthur C. Yap
 Betty Go-Belmonte
 Bong Go
 Chel Diokno
 Claudio Teehankee
 Danding Cojuangco
 Danilo Lim
 Dennis Uy
 Dino Reyes Chua
 Francis Escudero
 Francis Garchitorena
 Gemma Cruz-Araneta
 Gilbert Teodoro
 Gina Lopez
 Gregory S. Ong
 Herbert Bautista
 Imee Marcos
 Jaime Ongpin
 Jaime Sin
 Jesse Robredo
 José Cojuangco
 Jose Diokno
 Jose Maria Sison
 Joy Belmonte
 Francis Tolentino
 Lito Atienza
 Lucy Torres Gomez
 Luis Yangco
 Manuel Tinio
 Marcial Lichauco
 Mark Cojuangco
 Nikki Coseteng
 Panfilo Lacson
 Paolo Duterte
 Pedro Yap
 Peping Cojuangco
 Raul Roco
 Reno Lim
 Rex Gatchalian
 Rogelio de la Rosa
 Ruthlane Uy Asmundson
 Sebastian Duterte
 Wenceslao Vinzons
 Win Gatchalian

Ryukyu Kingdom
 Jana Ueekata
 Kaiki
 Ō Mō
 Rin Seikō
 Sai On
 Sai Taku
 Tei Fuku
 Tei Junsoku

Samoa
 Faaolesa Katopau Ainuu
 Muagututagata Peter Ah Him
 Niko Lee Hang
 Sua Rimoni Ah Chong
 Tuala Falani Chan Tung

Singapore
 Abdullah Tarmugi
 Alex Yam
 Aline Wong
 Alvin Tan
 Alvin Yeo
 Amy Khor
 Ang Hin Kee
 Ang Mong Seng
 Ang Wei Neng
 Ang Yong Guan
 Arthur Fong
 Baey Yam Keng
 Benjamin Pwee
 Carrie Tan
 Cedric Foo
 Chan Choy Siong
 Chan Chun Sing
 Chan Soo Sen
 Charles Chong
 Chay Wai Chuen
 Chee Hong Tat
 Chee Soon Juan
 Chen Show Mao
 Cheng Li Hui
 Cheo Chai Chen
 Cheryl Chan
 Chew Swee Kee
 Chia Shi-Lu
 Chia Thye Poh
 Chiam See Tong
 Chin Harn Tong
 Chin Tet Yung
 Chng Hee Kok
 Choa Chong Long
 Chong Kee Hiong
 Choo Wee Khiang
 Chor Yeok Eng
 Chua Sian Chin
 Cynthia Phua
 Daniel Goh
 Darryl David
 David Ong
 Denise Phua
 Dennis Tan
 Derrick Goh
 Desmond Choo
 Desmond Lee
 Desmond Lim
 Desmond Tan
 Dixie Tan
 Don Wee
 Edward Chia
 Edwin Tong
 Ellen Lee
 Eric Chua
 Foo Mee Har
 Francis Seow
 Gan Kim Yong
 Gan Siow Huang
 Gan Thiam Poh
 George Yeo
 Gerald Giam
 Goh Meng Seng
 Grace Fu
 Hany Soh
 Hazel Poa
 He Ting Ru
 Heng Chee How
 Henry Kwek
 Ho Geok Choo
 Ho Kah Leong
 Ho Peng Kee
 Hon Sui Sen
 Howe Yoon Chong
 Indranee Rajah
 Irene Ng
 Jamus Lim
 Jek Yeun Thong
 Jessica Tan
 Joan Pereira
 Josephine Teo
 Ker Sin Tze
 Khaw Boon Wan
 Koh Poh Koon
 Koo Tsai Kee
 Lam Pin Min
 Lawrence Wong
 Lee Bee Wah
 Lee Boon Yang
 Lee Chiaw Meng
 Lee Khoon Choy
 Lee Li Lian
 Lee Yi Shyan
 Lee Yock Suan
 Leong Mun Wai
 Lew Syn Pau
 Liang Eng Hwa
 Lily Neo
 Lim Biow Chuan
 Lim Boon Heng
 Lim Chin Siong
 Lim Hng Kiang
 Lim Hwee Hua
 Lim Kim San
 Lim Swee Say
 Lim Tean
 Lim Wee Kiak
 Lina Loh
 Ling How Doong
 Liu Thai Ker
 Loh Miaw Gong
 Louis Chua
 Louis Ng
 Low Thia Khiang
 Low Yen Ling
 Lui Tuck Yew
 Mah Bow Tan
 Matthias Yao
 Melvin Yong
 Ng Chee Meng
 Ng Eng Hen
 Ng Ling Ling
 Ng Pock Too
 Ong Chit Chung
 Ong Eng Guan
 Ong Pang Boon
 Ong Ye Kung
 Ooi Boon Ewe
 Patrick Tay
 Peh Chin Hua
 Penny Low
 Png Eng Huat
 Poh Li San
 Rachel Ong
 Raymond Lim
 Richard Hu
 Sam Tan
 Seah Kian Peng
 Seet Ai Mee
 Seng Han Thong
 Shawn Huang Wei Zhong
 Sim Ann
 Sin Boon Ann
 Sitoh Yih Pin
 Steve Chia
 Sun Xueling
 Sylvia Lim
 Tan Cheng Bock
 Tan Chuan-Jin
 Tan Jee Say
 Tan Kiat How
 Tan Kim Ching
 Tan Kin Lian
 Tan See Leng
 Tan Soo Khoon
 Tan Tock Seng
 Tan Wu Meng
 Tay Eng Soon
 Teh Cheang Wan
 Teo Ho Pin
 Teo Ser Luck
 Tin Pei Ling
 Tony Tan Lay Thiam
 Vivian Balakrishnan
 Walter Woon
 Wan Soon Bee
 Wee Siew Kim
 Xie Yao Quan
 Yee Jenn Jong
 Yeo Cheow Tong
 Yeo Guat Kwang
 Yeo Ning Hong
 Yeo Wan Ling
 Yeoh Ghim Seng
 Yip Hon Weng
 Yong Nyuk Lin
 Yu-Foo Yee Shoon
 Zeng Guoyuan

Solomon Islands
 Laurie Chan

South Africa
 Chris Wang
 Eugenia Shi-Chia Chang
 Sherry Chen
 Shiaan-Bin Huang

Soviet Union
 Magaza Masanchi

Switzerland
 Takna Jigme Sangpo
 Tseten Samdup Chhoekyapa

Thailand
 Apirak Kosayodhin
 Bhichit Rattakul
 Chuwit Chitsakul
 Chuwit Kamolvisit
 Giles Ji Ungpakorn
 Jermmas Chuenglertsiri
 Kalaya Sophonpanich
 Kanawat Chantaralawan
 Kantathi Suphamongkhon
 Khaw Soo Cheang
 Khun Phiphit Wathi
 Korn Chatikavanij
 Kraisak Choonhavan
 Luang Wichitwathakan
 Parit Wacharasindhu
 Phraya Ratsadanupradit Mahitsaraphakdi
 Piyabutr Saengkanokkul
 Thammarak Isarangkura na Ayudhaya
 Thanathorn Juangroongruangkit
 Thepthai Senapong
 Weng Tojirakarn

Trinidad and Tobago
 Eugene Chen
Franklin Khan
Gerald Yetming
 Michael Jay Williams
 Percy Chen
 Ronald Jay Williams
 Solomon Hochoy

United Kingdom
 Alan Mak
 Anna Lo
 George Macartney
 Hsiao Li Lindsay
 Johnny Luk
 Lydia Dunn
 Michael Chan
 Nat Wei
 Sarah Owen
 Steven Dominique Cheung
 Victoria Treadell

United States
 Aaron Ling Johanson
 Allan Fung
 Alex Sink
 Alex Wan
 Andrew Yang
 Angie Chen Button
 Anna Chennault
 Barry Chang
 Barry Wong
 Bertha Kawakami
 Betty Tom Chu
 Betty Yee
 Calvin Say
 Carmen Chu
 Carol Liu
 Charles Djou
 Charlie Chong
 Cheryl Chow
 Cheryl Lau
 Chris Lu
 Christian Fong
 Chuck Mau
 Clayton Hee
 Conrad Lee
 Cory Fong
 Daniel Akaka
 David Chiu
 David Kuo
 David M. Louie
 David S. C. Chu
 David Wu
 Derek Kan
 Donald Wong
 Doug Chin
 Duke Aiona
 Ed Chau
 Ed Jew
 Ed Lee
 Edmond J. Gong
 Edmund C. Moy
 Elaine Chao
 Elisa Chan
 Ellen Young
 Eric Mar
 Ervin Yen
 Evan Low
 Fiona Ma
 Frederick Pang
 Gary Locke
 Gene Wu
 Gordon Lau
 Gordon Quan
 Grace Meng
 Harry Lee
 Hiram Fong
 Isaac Choy
 James C. Ho
 James Kealoha
 Jan C. Ting
 Jean Quan
 Jeff Tien Han Pon
 Jessie Liu
 Jim Chu
 Jimmie R. Yee
 Jimmy Meng
 John B. Tsu
 John Chiang
 John Liu
 Joseph Apukai Akina
 Judy Chu
 Julia Chang Bloch
 Kaniela Ing
 Kansen Chu
 Karen Goh
 Katy Tang
 Kimberly Yee
 Kris Wang
 Lanhee Chen
 Leland Yee
 Lily Qi
 Lindy Li
 Ling Ling Chang
 Lisa Wong
 Mae Yih
 March Fong Eu
 Margaret Chin
 Martha Wong
 Matt Fong
 Mia Gregerson
 Michael Woo
 Michelle K. Lee
 Michelle Wu
 Mike Eng
 Mike Gin
 Mike Yin
 Ming Chin
 Nancy-Ann DeParle
 Norman Yee
 Otto Lee
 Paul Fong
 Peter Koo
 Phil Ting
 Phillip Chen
 Richard Pan
 Ruby Chow
 Rui Xu
 S. B. Woo
 Sandra Lee Fewer
 Sonia Chang-Díaz
 Stanley Chang
 Stephanie Chang
 Steven Chu
 Sue Chew
 Susan C. Lee
 Suzanne Chun Oakland
 Tammy Duckworth
 Ted Lieu
 Teodoro R. Yangco
 Theresa Mah
 Tina Tchen
 TJ Cox
 Tom Hom
 Tony Hwang
 Vince Fong
 William S. Richardson
 William Tong
 Wilma Chan
 Wing F. Ong
 Wing Luke
 Yiaway Yeh
 Yuh-Line Niou

Vietnam
 Đỗ Cảnh Thạc
 Nguyễn Khoan
 Nguyễn Siêu
 Nguyễn Thủ Tiệp
 Phan Thanh Giản
 Phan Xích Long
 Trần Lãm
 Trần Văn Lắm

Zimbabwe
 Fay Chung

See also
 Chinese emigration
 European politicians of Chinese descent
 List of Confucian states and dynasties
 List of Kapitan Cina
 List of overseas Chinese
 Overseas Chinese

Notes

References

Politicians of Chinese descent
Chinese diaspora
Politicians